Gaëlle Arquez (born 1983) is a French operatic mezzo-soprano.

Life and career 
Arquez was born in Saintes from a father with Spanish origins and a Malagasy mother. After spending her early childhood in Ivory Coast, she returned to Saintes, where at the age of 10 she took piano lessons at the town's conservatory. She graduated in musicology and studied singing at the Conservatoire de Paris. Her teachers included Malcolm Walker, Kenneth Weiss, Jeff Cohen and Susan McCulloch. In 2007 and 2008, she toured France singing the title role in Ravel's L'enfant et les sortilèges. In 2009, she took on the title role in Janáček's The Cunning Little Vixen in a conservatoire production in Paris, which was subsequently also shown at the Théâtre Royal de Wallonie in Liège and the Reims Opera House. She won a number of prizes and scholarships, including the Prix de Chant du Conservatoire national supérieur de musique de Paris in 2009.

Opera 
The focus of her repertoire is on Baroque music on the one hand, and on French classical repertoire on the other - from Lully and Rameau to Berlioz, Gounod, Offenbach and Bizet to Debussy and Messiaen. The singer is also known as a Mozart interpreter and occasionally makes "excursions" into the German, Italian and Czech repertoire.

In 2013, she made her debut at the Opéra Bastille and has since sung Monteverdi, Mozart and Verdi roles at this house. That year Arquez also made a guest appearance at the Ópera Nacional de Chile in Santiago de Chile.

2013 also saw her first appearances in German-speaking countries - as Medea in Handel's Teseo at the Oper Frankfurt and as Idamante in Mozart's Idomeneo at the Theater an der Wien, staged by Damiano Michieletto. She continues to sing in Frankfurt, including the title roles in Carmen and Serse as well as the role of Mélisande. In 2015, she took on the title role in Offenbach's La Belle Hélène at the Théâtre du Châtelet in Paris. In the same year she made her debut at the Bayerische Staatsoper in Munich and in 2016 at the Komische Oper Berlin. retrieved 1 February 2021. Les Musiciens du Louvre from Grenoble, conducted by Marc Minkowski, performed. Audience and press reacted enthusiastically, praising the singer's performance - both acting and vocal.

In summer 2017, she sang the title role in Carmen on the lake stage of the Bregenzer Festspiele.

Concert 
In the concert hall, Arquez stands out in particular with recitals and as a specialist for works by Olivier Messiaen. She has also sung in Villers-sur-Mer and Montfort-l'Amaury, in Neustadt an der Weinstraße and Karlsruhe, and at the Musashimo Cultural Foundation in Tokyo.

Arquez has sung under the musical direction of Pierre Boulez, René Jacobs, Philippe Jordan and Yann Molénat, among others.

Roles

Recordings 
 Vivaldi: Orlando furioso (Naïve, CD)
 Rameau: Dardanus (Alpha, CD 2013)
 Cherubini: Médée (DVD)
 Bizet: Carmen, (Live recording from the Bregenz Festival 2017, CMajor, DVD)

Awards 
 2006: Bourses Musicales of the Zonta Clubs de France
 2007: Yamaha Music Foundation of Europe Competition
 2009: Prix de Chant du Conservatoire national supérieur de musique de Paris
 2009: Wigmore Hall Independent Opera Voice Fellowship

References

External links 
 
 
 Arquez, Gaelle on Operabase.
 Opéra national de Paris, short biography (fin French)
 Theater an der Wien, short biography Gaëlle Arquez

French operatic mezzo-sopranos
Conservatoire de Paris alumni
1983 births
Living people
People from Saintes, Charente-Maritime